Wastella is a ghost town in northwest Nolan County, Texas, United States. It lies within the physiographic region known as the Rolling Plains to the southeast of the high plains of the Llano Estacado.

History
Wastella was platted 8 miles northwest of Roscoe on land provided by Will Neeley when the Roscoe, Snyder and Pacific Railway was constructed in 1908.  Neely named the town site for his eldest daughter, Wastella.

Wastella grew slowly and was never very large, but at one time it had a few stores, a hotel, a school, and a post office that opened in 1907.  Despite its key location along the Roscoe, Snyder and Pacific Railway, Wastella suffered from its close proximity to more significant towns such as Snyder, Roscoe, and Hermleigh.  The post office closed in the early 1930s. In 1980 and 1990, the population was 13, and the population dropped to only four in 2000.

See also
Clear Fork Brazos River
Brazos Wind Ranch
Roscoe Wind Farm
List of ghost towns in Texas

References

External links

Public domain photos of the Llano Estacado

Ghost towns in Texas
Unincorporated communities in Nolan County, Texas
Unincorporated communities in Texas